Aja are an ethnic group in the South Sudan state of Western Bahr el Ghazal.  They mostly live along the upper reaches of the Sopo River.

References
قبيلة
Ethnic groups in South Sudan 
أجا 

واحد من قبائل التي توجد من بعد مناطق دولة جنوب السودان  ولاية غرب بحر الغزال /  واو / راجا  و ثم تقع مناطقهم في راجا  إتجاه الشمال  غربي  من منطقة راجا